The 1956 Missouri Tigers football team was an American football team that represented the University of Missouri in the Big Seven Conference (Big 7) during the 1956 NCAA University Division football season. The team compiled a 4–5–1 record (3–2–1 against Big 7 opponents), finished in third place in the Big 7, and outscored its opponents by a combined total of 200 to 183. Don Faurot was the head coach for the 19th of 19 seasons. The team played its home games at Memorial Stadium in Columbia, Missouri.

The team's statistical leaders included Hank Kuhlman with 440 rushing yards and 37 points scored, Jim Hunter with 567 passing yards and 567 yards of total offense, and Charley James with 362 receiving yards.

Schedule

References

Missouri
Missouri Tigers football seasons
Missouri Tigers football